Michelle Wu (born January 14, 1985) is an American lawyer and politician serving as the mayor of Boston, Massachusetts, since 2021; she is a member of the Democratic Party. The daughter of Taiwanese immigrants, she was the first Asian American woman to serve on the Boston City Council. She was first elected to the council in 2013 and served from 2014 to 2021, including a stint as council president from 2016 to 2018. Wu was elected mayor in 2021, winning with 64% of the vote, becoming the first woman, first person of color, and first Asian American elected to serve as the mayor of Boston.

While on the Boston City Council, Wu authored several ordinances that were enacted. This included ordinances to prevent the city from contracting with health insurers that discriminate in their coverage against transgender individuals, protect wetlands, support adaption to climate change, enact a plastic bag ban, adopt Community Choice Aggregation, and provide paid parental leave to municipal employees. As a city councilor, Wu also partook in a successful effort to regulate short-term rentals. 

An advocate for a municipal "Green New Deal", Wu signed an ordinance to divest city investments from companies that derive more than 15 percent of their revenue from fossil fuels, tobacco products, or prison facilities. She also has announced plans for the city to spend $2 billion on school construction projects as part of the "Green New Deal" for the city's public schools. As mayor, she has also taken actions related to increasing affordable housing in the city and taken actions related to the city's COVID-19 policies. A supporter of fare-free public transportation, Wu has funded a three-year period of fare-free service on three MBTA bus routes, expanding on a single-route pilot program that had previously been started under Kim Janey's preceding acting mayoralty.

Wu is considered a political progressive and a protégée of Elizabeth Warren. Warren was one of Wu's professors in law school and Wu worked on Warren's 2012 United States Senate campaign.

Family, education, and early career
Wu was born in the South Side of Chicago, Illinois to Taiwanese American parents. She is the oldest of four children. Her first language is Mandarin Chinese. Wu's parents eventually divorced.

Wu graduated from Barrington High School in 2003, where she was valedictorian. In 2003, she was selected as a Presidential Scholar from Illinois. Wu moved to the Boston area to attend college at Harvard University, where she graduated with a degree in economics in 2007. She graduated from Harvard Law School in 2012.

After college, Wu worked as a consultant at the Boston Consulting Group. When her mother began to suffer from mental illness, she quit, moving back to Chicago to care for her mother and two youngest siblings. To support her family financially, Wu started a teahouse business. In 2009, she returned to Massachusetts with her mother and youngest siblings to earn her J.D. from Harvard Law School.

In 2010, Wu worked in Boston City Hall for Mayor Thomas Menino in the Office of Administration and Finance and later as a Fellow at the Rappaport Center in Law and Public Policy under Menino's chief of staff, Mitch Weiss. In 2010, Wu graduated from Emerge Massachusetts, a training program for women who aspire to elected office.

In her first semester at Harvard Law School, one of her professors was Elizabeth Warren. When Wu explained her family's situation, a long friendship developed between them. In 2012, Wu worked as the constituency director for Warren's 2012 campaign against Scott Brown. In this role, she coordinated outreach to all constituency groups, including communities of color, the LGBT community, veterans, and women. Wu is considered a protégée of Warren.

City Council

Wu, a Democrat, became a member of the Boston City Council in January 2014, after being first elected in November 2013, and was re-elected three times, the last time being in November 2019. Wu was the first Asian American woman to serve on the council, and only the second Asian American member to serve on the council. In late 2014, Wu became the first city councilor in Boston history to give birth while serving on the Boston City Council. From January 2016 to January 2018, she served as president of the council, the first woman of color and first Asian American to hold the role. During her tenure, Wu has chaired the Post Audit; Planning, Development and Transportation; and Oversight committees. Wu was regarded as a progressive on the Boston City Council.

Wu was first elected to a Boston City Council at-large seat in November 2013. She finished in second place to incumbent Ayanna Pressley; the top four finishers are elected to the council. She was re-elected in November 2015, again coming in second place to Pressley. She was re-elected to a third term on the council in November 2017, garnering the most votes among all at-large candidates; her tally of over 65,000 votes was the most since Michael J. McCormack in November 1983. Wu was again re-elected in November 2019. In 2021 election, Wu decided not to seek a fifth term on the City Council and to run for mayor instead.

In her 2019 campaign, Wu shared a campaign office with Kim Janey, who was seeking reelection as a district city councilor, and fellow at-large city council candidate Alejandra St. Guillen.

In the weeks prior to taking office, Wu announced that she would vote for Bill Linehan to serve as the president of the Boston City Council. Many of Wu's progressive backers were surprised, since Linehan was seen as the council's most conservative member. Wu said she believed that Linehan would be the most effective at running the City Council, and that she supported Linehan's promises to decentralize power away from the City Council president's office, empower the council's committee chairs, and reorganize the central staff of the City Council. The Council ultimately elected Linehan as its president by a 8–5 vote, with Linehan defeating a last-hour challenge from Ayanna Pressley.

Ahead of the start of Wu's third term on the city council, she began supporting Kim Janey to be the next president of the City Council. In the weeks before the 2020–22 Boston City Council term, the elected members were initially sharply divided in their support between Janey and Matt O'Malley. Wu's support played an important role in helping Janey secure the support to become City Council president. On January 6, 2020, Wu nominated Janey to be the council's president. Janey was elected with every member voting "yes" except for Frank Baker, who voted "present".

COVID-19 pandemic
Wu criticized some of Mayor Marty Walsh's initiatives amid the COVID-19 pandemic. Wu specifically criticized some of Walsh's COVID-19 initiative, which as the Boston Resiliency Fund and Racial Equity Fund, that solicited private sector donor funding, saying that "Philanthropy is wonderful" but that the government soliciting money from corporations and distributing it to nonprofits "creates a very disruptive and dangerous dynamic" with the effect of "distorting the political process." Wu criticized Walsh over a lack of minority-owned businesses receiving emergency coronavirus-related contracts (less than 2% of the $12 million in such contracts issued prior to July 2020 went to Boston-located minority-owned businesses, with only one such business being among eighty businesses to receive such contracts per data the Walsh administration had provided).

Wu has called for the city to facilitate an "equitable recovery" from the pandemic, chairing City Council hearings on the issue in 2020.

In February 2021, Wu proposed legislation that would seek to create an equitable distribution of the COVID-19 vaccine in Boston by requiring that at least one vaccination site be established in each residential neighborhood. She also partnered with fellow city councilor Annissa Essaibi George to propose a measure that would provide paid leave to municipal employees who felt ill after receiving the vaccine.

In early August 2021, Wu criticized Acting Mayor Kim Janey for failing to commit to require city workers to be vaccinated against COVID-19. Wu supported a mandate for city workers, including public school employees, to be vaccinated. Fellow mayoral candidates John Barros and Essaibi George opposed this.

In August 2021, Wu voiced support for implementing a vaccine passport program, requiring proof-of-vaccination for indoor dining and other public indoor activities. Fellow mayoral candidate Andrea Campbell had, days before Wu, made similar calls for the city to put in place rules which would require that many businesses require patrons provide proof of vaccination.

In the late summer of 2021, Wu's office compiled data that suggested that half of the city's Restaurant Revitalization Fund money that had been allocated to restaurants was given to establishments in only three of the city's 23 neighborhoods (Back Bay, Downtown Boston, and the Seaport District). It was noted that these were largely white and wealthy neighborhoods in comparison to the rest of the city. In June 2021, Wu expressed support for having a municipal eviction moratorium once the federal eviction moratorium expired.

Economy
In April 2015, the Boston City Council passed a paid parental leave ordinance that was authored by Wu. The ordinance provided city employees with six weeks of paid parental leave after childbirth, stillbirth, or adoption. Roughly a month before its passage in the City Council, Wu and Mayor Walsh co-authored an op-ed in The Boston Globe calling paid parental leave, "a must for working families". Mayor Walsh signed the ordinance into law in May. In 2021, Wu proposed the idea of expanding paid child leave to also provide leave to those who have had an abortion. In September, by voice vote, the Boston City Council passed an ordinance written by Councilor Lydia Edwards and co-sponsored by Wu and Annissa Essaibi George that changed the wording of her earlier ordinance from "stillbirth" to "pregnancy loss", and also extended paid family leave to those welcoming a new family member or acting as a caregiver. The ordinance was soon after signed into law by Acting Mayor Kim Janey.

Small business
In 2014, Wu headed the Boston City Council Special Committee on Small Business, Entrepreneurship, and Innovation. In June 2014, it released a report making 25 recommendations to streamline the city's licensing and permitting process for small businesses. In 2016, as City Council president, Wu supported a successful proposal to allow diners to bring their own alcoholic drinks into certain restaurants ("BYOB"), a move meant to promote economic vitality and assist restaurants unable to afford liquor licenses.

In January 2017, the city adopted an ordinance that Wu had introduced which allowed small businesses to forgo the fees and the bureaucratic approval process to host musical performances. In July 2018, Wu, along with fellow city councilors Lydia Edwards and Kim Janey, introduced legislation to remove as-of-right designations for chain stores, thereby requiring a conditional use permit for chain stores to open and operate in any area designated as a "neighborhood business district". Wu characterized the proposed ordinance as protecting small business from "commercial gentrification" and pressures from large retail chains. She declared, "this legislation supports jobs in our neighborhoods by giving residents and stakeholders a voice, so that our business districts are not just shaped by which multinational corporations can offer the highest rents".

Environmentalism
In October 2017, the Boston City Council voted to unanimously approve a resolution by Wu and fellow councilor Matt O'Malley, having the city adopt Community Choice Aggregation. In November 2017, the Boston City Council unanimously passed an ordinance written by Wu and fellow councilor Matt O'Malley which implemented a plastic bag ban. In December, Mayor Walsh signed it into law, despite his administration having previously opposed such a ban when it was previously debated by the Council in 2016.

Shortly after Senator Ed Markey and Congresswoman Alexandria Ocasio-Cortez unveiled their congressional resolution to recognize a duty of the Federal Government to create a Green New Deal, Wu introduced a resolution to the Boston City Council to declare the council's support for the proposed federal resolution and urge the federal government to adopt it. In April 2019, the Boston City Council passed the resolution. In December 2019, the Boston City Council passed an ordinance that Wu had introduced with Matt O'Malley that protects local wetlands and promotes adaption to climate change. Mayor Walsh signed it into law later that month. Wu also partnered with Councilor Kenzie Bok on a proposal aiming to create more affordable and climate resilient housing. For years, beginning in 2014, Wu spearheaded efforts to have the city divest its financial resources from fossil fuels. She would partner with City Councilors Matt O'Malley and Lydia Edwards on this matter.

In 2019, Wu marched in a protest with Extinction Rebellion Boston.

Proposal for a municipal Green New Deal

In August 2020, Wu released plans for "Boston Green New Deal & Just Recovery" program. The proposal aims to achieve carbon neutrality (net-zero carbon footprint) for the municipal government buildings by 2024, running the city on 100% renewable energy by 2030, and achieving citywide carbon neutrality by 2040. The proposal calls for creating "just and resilient development" through the establishment of affordable green overlay districts and standard community benefits agreements; priority planning zones informed by urban heat island maps, in order to expand the urban tree canopy; and a "local blue new deal" for coasts and oceans, using coastal and ocean resources for clean energy generation, sustainable food systems, carbon capture, and jobs.

Food justice
In March 2019, the City Council unanimously passed the Good Food Purchasing Program ordinance authored by Wu. The ordinance set new requirements for public food purchasers, such as Boston Public Schools. The new policy, supported by the Food Chain Workers Alliance, pushes the city towards greater purchasing of local and sustainably grown food, and focuses on racial equity in the food chain. In October 2020, Wu published a report on a "food justice" agenda in Boston; The agenda includes increasing the minimum wage for food-sector workers and providing guaranteed paid sick leave to them. The plan also calls for the city government to support state legislation that would gradually phase out the tipped wage for restaurant and bar workers.

Housing
Wu was the leading force in efforts to regulate short-term rentals of housing units. Wu pushed for increased restrictions, including the elimination of investor units. In April 2018, Wu was targeted by Airbnb for her stance over short-term rental regulations in the city of Boston. The short-term lodging platform accused Wu of being "aligned with big hotel interests against the interests of regular Bostonians". Boston adopted an ordinance, supported by Wu, that restricted short-term rentals to owner-occupied housing units, required hosts to register with the city, and required the city to collect and publish data on short-term rentals.

Wu has, since at least 2019, supported the idea of reviving rent stabilization in Boston, which would first require a change to state law. She argued that it will assist in preventing people of color from being pushed out of Boston.

Law enforcement
In June 2020, Wu, alongside fellow city councilors Lydia Edwards and Julia Mejia, introduced an ordinance that would establish an unarmed community safety crisis response system, moving the response to nonviolent 9-1-1 calls away from the Boston Police Department, and instead transferring the response to non-law enforcement agencies and trained health professionals. In 2020, Wu was one of eight city councilors to sign a letter urging Mayor Walsh to decrease the Boston Police Department's annual budget by 10%. Activists had been calling for such a cut, in order to instead allot that money to COVID-19 relief, housing and food access, and other programs that would benefit communities of color. In June 2020, Wu (along with Ricardo Arroyo, Kim Janey, and Julia Mejia) was one of five members of the Boston City Council to vote against Mayor Walsh's 2021 operating budget for the city. While the budget made $12 million in cuts to the overtime budget of the police department, Wu argued that the city was still contractually obligated to pay for every hour of overtime work, meaning that it was inconsequential what the line item in the city budget proposed.

Wu voiced her desire to "demilitarize" the city's police department. Wu led an effort to take account of the Boston Police Department's military equipment. In June 2020, Wu introduced an order to the City Council that, if passed, would have required the disclosure of information about the Boston Police Department's heavy-duty equipment, and regarding how it had been deployed during recent protests. In Boston, such City Council orders require the backing of all City Council members. Wu advocated for closing loopholes in the policy of the Boston Police Department regarding body cameras.

Transportation

In April 2016, Wu filed a petition seeking to offer an annual excise tax break to electric vehicle owners. In the early summer of 2019, Wu led protests of Massachusetts Bay Transportation Authority (MBTA) fare hikes by riders complaining about inferior subway, light-rail, and bus line services. In 2019, Wu was the lead sponsor on a City Council proposal that would have established a fee for resident parking permits. Her proposal exempted low-income residents, home-healthcare workers, and certain school workers from the fee. Wu has also called for local representation on the MBTA's governing board.

Wu has proposed eliminating fares for local public transit. Wu argued that the MBTA should explore the possibility of eliminating fares in a January 31, 2019  op-ed published in The Boston Globe. Later in 2019, she and fellow councilor Kim Janey proposed making the MBTA Route 28 bus fare-free. Janey would later fund a pilot program to make the bus route fare-free for three months while acting mayor in 2021. As mayor, Wu extended the pilot on the route 28 bus, adding two additional routes to serve other lower-income areas of the city free of charge for all riders beginning March 1, 2022, and extending for two years. The charges were picked up by the city using funds from $8 million in federal pandemic relief funds. Wu's advocacy is seen as popularizing the idea of fare-free public transportation in Boston. Crediting Wu as a leader on fare-free public transit, in January 2021, the editorial board of The Boston Globe endorsed the idea of making the city's buses fare-free. Wu's promotion of fare-free public transit also inspired Lawrence, Massachusetts mayor Daniel Rivera to implement it in his city.

Zoning and permitting
Wu has advocated for reforming the city's permitting system. Wu has called for the abolition of the Boston Planning & Development Agency, which she has characterized as being extremely politicized and "opaque". In 2019, her office published a 72-page report on the matter. Wu came into conflict with mayor Marty Walsh over his appointees to the city's Zoning Board of Appeals.

Other matters
In June 2014, the Boston City Council unanimously passed an ordinance Wu coauthored with fellow councilwoman Ayanna Pressley, which prohibits Boston's city government, "from contracting with any health insurer that denies coverage or discriminates in the amount of premium, policy fees, or rates charged...because of gender identity or expression". This ordinance guaranteed healthcare (including gender reassignment surgery, hormone therapy, and mental health services) to transgender city employees and their dependents. Wu called the ordinance, "a matter of equity and of fairness". The ordinance had the support of Mayor Walsh prior to its passage.

In 2018, Wu proposed legislation that would establish a city identification card program in Boston.  Wu was a leading force in the years-long effort that established the Boston Little Saigon Cultural District.

In 2019, Wu supported a proposed ordinance introduced by Councilor Kim Janey which aimed to ensure that the legal cannabis industry in Boston would be equitable and fair for racial minority owners. This plan, in part, works to do so by only issuing business licenses to qualifying equity applicants for a period of two-years. The ordinance also included a new oversight board to assess and vote on applications for licenses based on a set criteria. It was by the City Council in November 2019. Walsh signed the ordinance into law later that month.

In September 2017, the Boston City Council voted to approve a Home Rule Petition authored by Wu which, if approved by the Massachusetts State Legislature, would have given the mayor of Boston the power to appoint members to vacant or expired seats on certain municipal boards and commissions in the incident that the nominating entity failed to submit names within 90 days of being notified of the vacancy. It would also make it so that all municipal boards and commissions in Boston would have a residency requirement.

Wu partnered with fellow councilor Kim Janey to probe the city's process for awarding municipal contracts, finding that only 1% municipal contracts were going to women and minority-owned vendors. These findings were the impetus for a subsequent move by the city to start looking at ways to diversify the recipients of city contracts.

Other political activity

In 2016, Wu endorsed Lydia Edwards' unsuccessful campaign in the special election for the Suffolk and Middlesex Massachusetts Senate district.

Wu was among the earliest supporters of Ayanna Pressley's successful 2018 Democratic primary election challenge to incumbent U.S. congressman Mike Capuano. In the 2018 election cycle, Wu also endorsed Jay Gonzalez's unsuccessful campaign in the Massachusetts gubernatorial election. She also endorsed State Senator Byron Rushing in his unsuccessful 2018 reelection campaign.

Wu endorsed Elizabeth Warren's 2020 presidential campaign in a speech at Warren's official campaign launch in February 2019. Wu was a campaign surrogate for Warren, campaigning on her behalf in New Hampshire and Iowa ahead of those states' primary and caucuses, respectively.

Recognition
At the end of 2013, the readers of Boston magazine voted Wu to be named the magazine's 2013 "Rookie of the Year", one three political awards given by the magazine that year. In 2017, the Massachusetts Democratic Party awarded Wu its Franklin and Eleanor Roosevelt Award, which it considers its highest honor. In March 2018, Wu was among six finalists to be honored as a "Rising Star" by EMILY's List, a national group that supports female Democratic candidates who support abortion rights. The next month, Wu was listed as one of the "100 Most Influential People in Boston" by Boston magazine, being listed 31st on the list, which opined, "Ambitious, smart, and just 33 years old, Wu is positioned to be a force in this town for decades to come." In 2019, Rachel Allen of The Atlantic wrote that Wu had emerged as one of Boston's "most effective politicians".

Mayoral campaign

Primary election
Since at least 2019, Wu was viewed as a potential challenger to incumbent mayor Marty Walsh, if Walsh sought reelection in 2021. In September 2020, Walsh told The Boston Globe that Wu had told him of her intent to run in 2021. Later that month, Wu announced her candidacy, declaring that she was running a "people-powered campaign to bring new leadership to Boston's executive office".

Walsh was designated by President-elect Joe Biden to be his nominee for Secretary of Labor on January 7, 2021, leaving the mayor's race an open seat. Senator Elizabeth Warren endorsed Wu for mayor two days later.

In April, an analysis by The Boston Globe found that, of the six major candidates then-running, Wu had received the least financial contributions from real estate developers. Andrew Martinez of Bisnow related this to Wu's plans to abolish the Boston Planning & Development Agency.

Wu's primary election campaign was seen as possibly being boosted by a collection of young internet activists who had vigorously supported her campaign, referred to as the "Markeyverse" due to their support for Senator Ed Markey in his successful re-election campaign the previous year. She was endorsed by a number of progressive groups, including #VOTEPROCHOICE

By September 2021, Wu was widely considered to be the front-runner in the nonpartisan primary election, with a significant polling lead. Her campaign emphasized "wonkery" (policy details), in a manner resembling Wu's mentor Elizabeth Warren.

General election
Wu placed first in the nonpartisan primary and advanced to the general election, where she faced fellow city council member Annissa Essaibi George.

On September 25, Acting Mayor Kim Janey, who placed fourth in the nonpartisan primary, endorsed Wu for the general election.

Wu was viewed as the front-runner in the general election campaign, with advantages in endorsements, including from cultural groups, Congresswoman Ayanna Pressley, both of Massachusetts' U.S. Senators (Ed Markey and Elizabeth Warren), and the editorial board of The Boston Globe.

Ellen Barry of The New York Times characterized Wu as having benefited as a candidate from her years of engagement with the city's residents as a city councilor. She opined that Wu's work while on the City Council had introduced her to many of the city's voters, and that Wu was, "difficult to caricature as a radical."

On November 2, 2021, Wu won the election with over 64% of the vote, becoming the first woman and first person of color to become mayor of Boston. Wu won sizable margins among various demographic groups, leading her victory to be characterized as one with a multiethnic coalition. Wu was sworn in on November 16, 2021.

Platform and campaign positions
In both the primary and general elections, Wu ran on a progressive-oriented agenda. Wu's mayoral platform included her previously-outlined proposals for a municipal Green New Deal, fare-free public transit, abolishing the Boston Planning & Development Agency, implementing a food justice agenda, and her previously-declared support to reinstate rent stabilization. In her campaign, Wu also supported restructuring the Boston School Committee (which is currently all-appointed since mayoral control of schools was adopted in Boston in the 1990s) to be majority-elected. Wu also called for the creation of the Teacher Advisory Board, and the empowerment of the Boston Student Advisory Committee. Wu proposed implementing universal preschool and universal child care for Boston children under five years of age, and for the creation of a city office to coordinate early childhood education. Wu's police reform plan reiterated her earlier calls for the diversion of nonviolent 9-1-1 calls away from police and instead to alternative response teams such as mental health clinicians, social workers, and community outreach workers. After a king tide caused Morrissey Boulevard to become flooded in November 2020, Wu reiterated support for a municipal Green New Deal and for accelerating city government timelines for carbon neutrality and exclusive renewable energy usage in the city at a meeting with activists along the thoroughfare.

Mayoralty

Transition into office
Wu had a shorter transition into office than most mayors of Boston due to the fact that there was no permanent incumbent mayor at the time of the election. Under Boston's city charter, in such circumstances, new mayors are sworn in as soon as is conveniently possible after the results of the election are certified. Before the election, on September 24, candidates Wu and Essaibi George had met with Acting Mayor Janey at the Francis Parkman House and mutually agreed on November 16 date as a tentative date for a transition of power for the mayoralty. Wu would ultimately take office as mayor on that planned date. This meant that she had only a two-week period between her election and assumption of office.

After Wu won election, she named Acting Mayor Janey as honorary chair of her mayoral transition team. Former State Representative and Boston Housing Chief Charlotte Golar Richie, former Massachusetts gubernatorial nominee Jay Gonzalez, and activist Mimi Ramos served as transition co-chairs of the transition. Among the transition's numerous advisors was Julian Agyeman.

Environment and climate change

On November 22, 2021, Wu signed an ordinance to divest city investments from companies that derive more than 15 percent of their revenue from fossil fuels, tobacco products, or prison facilities. This is seen as being part of her pursuit of a municipal Green New Deal for Boston. The process will entail the divestment of $65 million in city assets. The new rules do not apply to Boston's employee pension fund, which is governed by state law. While a member of the city council, she had fought for the adoption of such a policy.

In August 2022, Wu unveiled a proposed home rule petition that would see the city request entrance to the state's pilot program for municipalities to ban fossil fuels from most new buildings, with the exception of labs and hospitals. The following month, the Boston City Council approved the home rule petition 9–3. The next step is for the state legislature to rule on whether to grant the petition.

On May 16, 2022, Wu pledged that the city would spend carry out a "Green New Deal" for Boston Public Schools (BPS) school buildings, which will see renovation of existing facilities and the construction new ones. This plan expands the funding the city is to invest in school construction from the $1 billion outlined in Marty Walsh's 2015 BuildBPS plan to $2 billion.

In April 2022, on Earth Day, as part of the city's Climate Ready Boston efforts, Wu unveiled the Heat Resilience for Boston plan. This plan centers on combatting the impacts of rising heat extremes, focusing on the "environmental justice communities" of Chinatown, Dorchester, East Boston, Mattapan, and Roxbury. Wu also announced the creation of the Boston Extreme Temperatures Response Task Force to coordinate efforts across the city related to handling heat extremes.

Wu retained Mariama White-Hammond in her role as the city's chief of environment, energy, and open space; a position focused on environmentalism. In August 2022, Wu announced that, in the following month, Oliver Sellers-Garcia would begin serving in the newly-created senior advisory position of "green new deal director". This position advises the mayor's office on steps towards climate resiliency. In September 2022, Wu announced the creation of the Cabinet for Worker Empowerment. One of the tasks this new department was given is to oversee the implementation of her Green New Deal for Boston Public Schools. The school district are planned 

In July 2022, it was announced that the ceremonies for the second edition of the Earthshot Prize, an environmentalism award founded by Prince William and The Royal Foundation, would be held in Boston in December 2022. The City of Boston are joining the John F. Kennedy Presidential Library and Museum as host partners for the award ceremony. Wu spoke with Prince William about arrangements for the event. In early November 2022, it was announced that the event's official host committee would include Wu, along with Governor Charlie Baker, John Kerry (the U.S. special presidential envoy for climate), Karen Spilka (president of the Massachusetts Senate), and Ronald Mariano (speaker of the Massachusetts House of Representatives).

Wu serves on the steering committee on Climate Mayors.

COVID-19
In December 2021, Wu announced a city COVID-19 vaccine mandate. Under the mandate, people ages 12 and older, in order to enter indoor public venues (bars, restaurants, gyms, theaters, and sports venues) in Boston, would be required to show proof of at least their first COVID-19 vaccine dose by January 15, 2022, and of full vaccination by February 15, 2022. The mandate promoted opposition, and in an interview with Boston Public Radio, Wu stated that she received racist messages in response to vaccine requirements. Some opponents circulated false rumors about Wu being hospitalized for panic attacks while in office. On February 19, 2022, Wu announced that the city would end its proof-of-vaccine mandate for public places with immediate effect.

The Wu administration also required city employees to be vaccinated against COVID-19 (with exceptions for employees with medical reasons and religious objectors), and about 94% of city employees were in compliance with that requirement by late January 2022. Wu extended the deadline for city employees to comply. Some public employee unions fought the mandate in court, arguing that the mandate rules should be subject to collective bargaining. A Massachusetts Appeals Court judge sided with the unions, blocking the city worker mandate. Wu faced persistent demonstrations outside of her house protesting her COVID measures.

Housing and development
Wu has given far less appointments for one-on one meetings with private developers than her predecessors did, giving them less opportunities to directly lobby her on policies.

In her early months as mayor, Wu moved hundreds of unhoused individuals that had been living in the Mass and Cass area to temporary housing. In January 2022, Wu designated $50 million to fund improvements to the Mildred C. Hailey Aprtments complex in the Jamaica Plain neighborhood. In March 2022, Wu announced the creation of a Rent Stabilization Advisory Committee, which will report the city's Office of Housing on Strategies with advice on means to stabilize rents in the  city and to combat the displacement of tenants, with the aim of creating a proposal to present to the City Council. In January 2022, Wu  also signed an executive order to adopt a municipal Affirmatively Furthering Fair Housing policy. This made Boston the largest city in the United States to adopt such a policy.

In September 2022, when Wu had an opportunity to nominate ten individuals to serve on the Boston Zoning Board of Appeal, she nominated only three Walsh appointees for reappointment. Her nominees were noted to be diverse. Some of the nominees included first generation immigrants, income-restricted renters, and building trades members.

In December 2021, Wu signed into law an ordinance amending the city's zoning code by eliminating off-street parking minimums for new affordable developments where 60% of the units are income-restricted at 100% the area median income in order to remove a barrier for the construction of new units of affordable housing. In October 2022, Wu signed an executive order that changed the approval process in the city for new income-restricted affordable housing developments. The order sought to halve the time that the approval process takes. Impacting nine city agencies (including the BPDA), the order established a separate review and approval process for affordable housing developments and requested the BPDA give priority to such developments.

In October 2022, the city of Boston provided $12 million in funding to assist in the acquisition of thirty-six apartment buildings in East Boston by the East Boston Neighborhood Trust, a new organization that is the first mixed-income neighborhood trust (MINT) in the state of Massachusetts. The trust is managed by the East Boston Community Development Corporation, a neighborhood organization. The acquisition of these buildings by the new trust, in consort with a municipal deed restriction, will ensure that the 114 housing units in these buildings permanently remain affordable. The city's funding to this came from $9 million received from the American Rescue Plan Act, $2 million received in the CARES Act, and $1 million in inclusionary development funds.

On March 8, 2023, in a 11-2 vote the Boston City Council consented to two home rule petitions proposed by Wu: one asking the state government to permit the city implement a form of rent control, and the other asking the state to permit Boston to implement Wu's plan to restructure the Boston Planning & Development Agency. The two petitions will need to be approved by the state government in order for Boston to be granted these permissions.

Wu has worked with the state government to seek federal funding to realign the Massachusetts Turnpike's route through the Beacon Park Yard. The realignment would enable plans by Harvard University to build development above the railroad tracks and realigned turnpike. It would also help  to bridge a community divide created in the 1960s by the construction of the viaduct on which the highway currently runs.

Transportation
Boston's public transportation operator, the MBTA, is a division of the Massachusetts Department of Transportation (MassDOT), limiting the power that the mayor of Boston has over transportation in the city. Nevertheless, Wu has taken actions and voiced positions related to the city's transportation.

Wu has called for Bostonians to have a more direct voice in the MBTA. 

In August 2022, Wu's city administration and the state government worked together to prepare for and alleviate the impact of a several-week closure of a key segment of the MBTA Orange Line to facilitate needed repairs. Wu outlined alternate public transportation means that could utilized by MBTA riders during the closure. Wu also urged Boston area residents that could to utilize MBTA commuter rail lines in order to avoid increased road congestion anticipated to result from the Orange Line closure. Wu also worked to facilitate the operations shuttle busses to several neighborhoods, making sure space was reserved for the loading and unloading of passengers. Wu urged employers in the parts of the city impacted by the closure to avoid giving penalties to employees that show up tardy to work as a consequence of their impacted commutes. Amid this closure and other concerns, such as a temporary closure of a smaller part of the MBTA Green Line, Wu disagreed with the prospect of the Federal Transit Administration assuming control of the MBTA, remarking that the system's problems, which she called "a breaking point", called for, "a partnership, not a takeover" from the federal government.

Also in August 2022, Wu and local transit advocacy organizations requested federal assistance to be provided to the MBTA to address service cuts made to the MBTA's service as a result of staffing shortages.They urged for the state's congressional delegation and for United States Secretary of Transportation Pete Buttigieg to take action to direct assistance to the MBTA.

Fare-free bus routes
In December 2021 Wu extended the fare-free pilot program for the MBTA Route 28 bus that was started under the acting mayoralty of Kim Janey by two months. She did this with while engaging in talks with the MBTA to further extend the pilot program. The City had, in November 2021, announced that its data showed that during the pilot program ridership had increased to an excess of 70,000 in weekly ridership. Pre COVID-pandemic weekly ridership on the route had been 47,000, making the COVID-era pilot program ridership significantly greater despite the general impact of the COVID-19 pandemic on public transportation rider. The city concluded that, in comparison to ridership trends on comparable routes of the MBTA, the increase in ridership was directly attributable to the pilot program. A later more in-depth 2022 analysis found an overall 38% increase in weekday ridership from 7,500 before the pandemic to 10,200 during the September and October periods during the pilot program. 

In mid-November 2021, Wu sent an appropriations order to the Boston City Council to asking for approval to appropriate $8 million of federal funds to fund two years of fare-free service on the MBTA Route 23, 28, and 29 buses. These buses serve the Dorchester, Mattapan, and Roxbury communities. At the start of December, the City Council approved the appropriations order 12–1. On February 9, 2022, it was announced by Wu and MBTA General Manager Steve Poftak that the two-year program for the three routes to be fare-free was officially agreed to and would be launched on March 1, 2022.

Racial equity
Wu has expressed a belief that her cabinet should be reflective of the city's population, arguing that that is consequential towards making the city's government more responsive to its different communities. People of color hold a majority in her cabinet. As of August 2022, Wu's cabinet had thirteen Black members, thirteen White members, six Latinx members, and two Asian American members.

In February 2022, Wu established the city's Office for Black Male Advancement (OBMA), which will be a component of the city's already-existing Equity and Inclusion Cabinet. Wu's office stated that,  The office will, among other responsibilities, design projects and programs to promote equity benefiting Black men and boys, advancing the representation of Black men and boys in city government, and collaborating with the city on advocating for state and federal programs and legislation related to Black men and boys. The office will also oversee the Commission on Black Men and Boys that had been established by an ordinance signed by Kim Janey during her acting mayoralty. The following month, Wu appointed the inaugural twenty-one members of the Commission on Black Men and Boys.

In January 2022, Wu signed an executive order to adopt a municipal Affirmatively Furthering Fair Housing policy. This made Boston the largest city in the United States to adopt such a policy.

Education and childcare
In May 2022, Wu unveiled plans for a "Green New Deal" for Boston Public School buildings which doubles the capital spending that the city will devote to the construction new and renovated school buildings to $2 billion compared to the $1 million that had been outlined in former mayor Marty Walsh's 2015 BuildBPS plan. Wu has pledged for the city to have a more equitable and transparent process for school construction and capital improvements than in the past and that the process will involve input from students, educators, and parents. In September 2022, Wu announced the creation of the Cabinet for Worker Empowerment. One of the tasks of this new department is providing oversight to this "Green New Deal" for the city's schools. Another of the department's tasks is to establish a trust fund for childcare.

In mid-2022, Wu distributed grants to family childcare providers. In July 2022, Wu signed an executive order which outlined the formula for what funds developers building in the city's downtown must contribute to fund child care services in the city. This executive order builds upon a policy implemented in 1989 under the mayoralty of Raymond Flynn which requires that new commercial developments in the city's downtown provide childcare services on-site or otherwise fund resources for off-site childcare spaces. However, the policy had, previous to Wu's executive order, been difficult to enforce due to the fact that the policy did not previous provide a clear definition of the amounts that developers needed to pay.

Wu nominated Tommy Welch to serve as superintendent of Boston Public Schools. He was confirmed by the Boston School Committee in a 4–3 vote in July 2022. Wu has opposed proposals by the state to place Boston Public Schools into state receivership, which arise from negative assessments of the city's schools in studies that were taken in 2020, before her mayoralty.

Employment and labor

In August 2022, Boston received a $23 million American Rescue Plan challenge grant from the Economic Development Administration to establish a Regional Workforce Training System aimed at training and placing individuals for 4,618 quality jobs in targeted industries over three years starting in October 2022. The Mayor's Office of Workforce Development had been the lead applicant, working with other there parties and organizations in their grant application. On Labor Day 2022, Wu announced the creation of the Cabinet for Worker Empowerment. One of the tasks this new department was assigned is overseeing the creation of more job training centers in the city.

2022 North End outdoor dining policy
In early 2022, some restaurant owners, particularly many in Boston's North End, criticized Wu for only allowing North End restaurants to take part in the city's pilot outdoor dining program a month after restaurants in other neighborhoods were allowed to participate, and for levying a $7,500 charge for North End restaurants that wished to take part in the pilot program while not charging that fee for other parts of the city. Wu argued that the rationale for this was that seventy-seventy outdoor dining patios were located in a single  area of the North End, a particularly large number in a small area. Wu claimed that these policies were done in an attempt to help "strike the right balance with thoughtful spacing, time limitations, increased safety protections, and other resources necessary to mitigate the impacts on parking, trash, rodents, and public safety." 

In addition to affected restaurant owners' resistance, this controversy was taken up as a cause by many general critics of Wu, making it a heated matter. 

Boston Herald political columnist Joe Battenfeld, a general critic of Wu, expressed agreement with Wu's policies related to North End restaurants, calling it, "one of the few times Wu has been right in her young administration." He argued that the charge seemed to be "a reasonable amount", and argued that if the restaurants did not pay for the expenses related to the impact of their use of road and sidewalk space, the expenses be borne by the city's taxpayers. Battenfeld asked his readers, "Why should taxpayers subsidize restaurants, which make a hefty profit, for their outdoor dining spaces? The answer is they shouldn't." Contrarily, when Tufts University political science professor Jeffrey Berry gave WCVB-TV his overall positive assessment of Wu's first six months in office, he expressed the belief that her handling of outdoor dining on the North End had been a significant misstep. He opined, "The North End mess, and I do call it a mess, is a self-inflicted wound. It was not necessary. She overreached in terms of what she was going to charge restaurateurs there. It seemed excessive."

Other matters

After a seven-month search, Wu named Michael Cox as the new commissioner of the Boston Police Department in July 2022.

In October 2022, Wu vetoed a 20% pay increase for city councilors that had been passed by the City Council. Wu had supported an 11% increase, which had been the recommendation of Boston’s compensation advisory board, but opposed a 20% increase.

In March 2022, by a 9–4 vote, the City Council passed an ordinance that had been proposed the previous month by Wu to limit the hours at which targeted protests outside of people's homes can take place to between 9 a.m. and 9 p.m. Wu herself had been the subject of targeted protesting outside of her home against her COVID-19 measures. Violations are punishable by fine. The ordinance generated some controversy.

Political activity
Wu endorsed Sonia Chang-Díaz's candidacy in the Democratic primary of the 2022 Massachusetts gubernatorial election. After Chang-Díaz withdrew from the race, Wu endorsed Maura Healey's gubernatorial candidacy. Wu endorsed the unsuccessful campaign of Shannon Liss-Riordan in the Democratic primary of the 2022 Massachusetts attorney general election. In 2022, she supported Chris Dempsey's unsuccessful campaign in the Democratic primary for Massachusetts state auditor. Also in 2022, Wu endorsed Steven W. Tompkins' reelection campaign for Suffolk County sheriff before his Democratic primary. Wu also endorsed a number of state legislature candidates in 2022. Before past sexual assault allegations against him became known, Wu had endorsed Ricardo Arroyo's 2022 campaign for Suffolk County district attorney. However, after the allegations surfaced, Wu and many joined many other prominent politicians in withdrawing her nomination of Arroyo. Wu supported the reelection campaign of Raphael Warnock in the 2022 United States Senate election in Georgia.

Recognition

The Harvard College Class of 2022 selected Wu to be their Class Day speaker. In 2022, Time magazine recognized Wu in its Time100 Next list of emerging leaders. The article accompanying her entry was authored by Congresswoman Ayanna Pressley. In 2022, Wu received the "Catalyst for Justice Award" from Massachusetts Public Health Association. In 2022, Boston magazine ranked Wu at the top of its list of "100 Most Influential Bostonians" list. The Boston Bar Association has announced that they will give Wu the "Voice of Change" award at the 2023 Beacon Awards for Diversity, Equity & Inclusion.

Policy positions
In a September 2022 article, Ginia Bellafante of The New York Times described Wu as an "progressive but not aggressively ideological" mayor.

Environmentalism
Wu has spearheaded a number of implemented environmental policies both during her time as a city councilor and as mayor.

Wu has supported the resolution authored by Senator Ed Markey and Congresswoman Alexandria Ocasio-Cortez to recognize a duty of the federal government to create a Green New Deal. In August 2020, Wu laid out her proposal for a municipal Green New Deal program for the city of Boston.

Wu has called attention to the health risks that many residents, and disproportionately people of color, face due to air pollution from highways, especially in Chinatown Wu has been a supporter of disinvestment from fossil fuels. 
 She spearheaded municipal legislation on such disinvestment.

Business policies and regulations
As a city councilor, Wu called for reforming the procurement process for city contracts in order to ensure that businesses owned by people of color, women, and city residents are given a "fair shot" at winning contracts. She also called for the city to provide assistance for entrepreneurs of color as well as support for small neighborhood businesses. She also called for greater government transparency regarding corporate tax breaks, and introduced an ordinance in 2019 that was aimed at accomplishing that. In December 2017, after the Boston City Council passed the "Ordinance on Equity in Opportunity for City Contracting", Wu and fellow city councilor Ayanna Pressley authored an op-ed published in the Dorchester Reporter which hailed the ordinance and argued that the city needed to "continue to create pipelines for local residents and businesses owned by women and people of color."

Employment practices
In February 2014, the Boston City Council unanimously passed a resolution authored by Wu which voiced the City Council's support for the Massachusetts Domestic Workers' Bill of Rights that was pending before the Massachusetts State Legislature.

As City Councilor, Wu voiced support for a “fair work week”, $15 minimum wage, paid family and medical leave, protections for freelancerss.

In October 2018, Wu proposed a "fair work week" ordinance, which would have required all city contractors to give employees at least two weeks of notice prior to changing their schedules, and would require employers to compensate workers for late schedule changes. 

Wu’s 2020 proposal for a “food justice” agenda for Boston called for an increase to the minimum wage paid to food-sector workers and for providing guaranteed paid sick leave to them. It also took a stance in favor of gradually phasing out tipped wage for restaurant and bar workers.

As a city councilor, Wu authored an adopted ordinance which provided paid parental leave to municipal employees. Before the passage of the ordinance by the City Council, Wu and Mayor Mary Walsh co-authored an op-ed in The Boston Globe that called paid parental leave, "a must for working families".

Housing
Since as early as 2019, Wu has supported reviving rent stabilization in Boston, which would first require a change to state law.

Wu's 2020 Municipal Green New Deal proposal calls for "decommodifying housing" through the expansion of cooperative housing, community land trusts, and community ownerships. It also calls for the establishment of a renters' right to counsel, guaranteeing legal representation to tenants in eviction proceedings.

Transit
Wu advocated for late night public transit in her original platform when running for City Council in 2012. In this vein, in 2015, she voiced her support for having the MBTA extend its pilot "late-night T" program, which kept transit service open late on the weekends.

Wu is a supporter of fare-free public transit. Wu argued in a in a January 31, 2019 op-ed published in The Boston Globe that the MBTA should explore the elimination of transit fares, writing 

She further argued that Boston should set an example for the rest of the county in free access to transit, likening it to past municipal innovations the city introduced. Wu's 2020 proposal for a municipal Green New Deal incorporated her proposal for fare-free public transit.

Wu has supported federal legislation on the matter of fare-free public transit, including helping Senator Ed Markey and Congresswoman Ayanna Pressley in 2020 to promote their proposed "Freedom to Move Act".  The act would provide grants to communities that eliminate transit fares.

Wu's advocacy is seen as popularizing the idea of fare-free public transportation in Boston. Crediting Wu as a leader on fare-free public transit, in January 2021, The Boston Globe's editorial board endorsed the idea of making the city's buses fare-free. Wu's promotion of fare-free public transit also inspired Lawrence, Massachusetts mayor Daniel Rivera to implement it in his city.

Both Kim Janey, as acting mayor, and Wu, as mayor, took steps that introduced fare-free transit on several bus routes in the city.

Other matters
In 2016, Wu supported Massachusetts Question 4 to legalize the recreational use of cannabis in Massachusetts. This put her at odds with Mayor Marty Walsh, who was a prominent opponent of legalization.

Wu supports protecting access to abortion.

As a City Councilor, Wu voiced support for participatory budgeting.

Personal life 
When Wu was in her early twenties, living in Boston and working for Boston Consulting Group, her mother developed severe mental illness and was diagnosed with schizophrenia. Wu returned to the family home in the Chicago suburbs to care for the mother and raise her two youngest siblings. She opened a teahouse, hoping her mother might recover enough to run it. She also secured medical care for her mother. Later, after moving back to Boston with her mother and sister, she became the legal guardian of her youngest sibling, and entered law school. She sees this as the turning point of her life.

Wu married Conor Pewarski in September 2012. They live in Boston's Roslindale neighborhood with their two sons and her mother.

Electoral history

City Council

 write-in votes

Mayor

See also
 List of first women mayors in the United States

References

External links

Official campaign website
Michelle Wu – City Councilor, At-Large | City of Boston

|-

1985 births
Living people
21st-century American politicians
21st-century American women politicians
American mayors of Asian descent
American politicians of Chinese descent

American politicians of Taiwanese descent
American women of Chinese descent in politics

American women of Taiwanese descent in politics
Asian-American city council members
Asian-American people in Massachusetts politics
Boston City Council members
Boston Consulting Group people
Harvard College alumni
Harvard Law School alumni
Lawyers from Boston
Massachusetts Democrats
Mayors of Boston
People from Roslindale
Politicians from Chicago
Women city councillors in Massachusetts
Women mayors of places in Massachusetts